The 1966 NAIA World Series was the tenth annual tournament hosted by the National Association of Intercollegiate Athletics to determine the national champion of baseball among its member colleges and universities in the United States and Canada.

The tournament was played at Phil Welch Stadium in St. Joseph, Missouri.

Linfield defeated Lewis (IL) in the championship series, 15–4, to win the Wildcats' first NAIA World Series.

Linfield pitcher Stuart Young was named tournament MVP.

Bracket

See also
 1966 NCAA University Division baseball tournament

Reference

NAIA World Series
NAIA World Series
NAIA World Series